James Harbour (born November 10, 1962) is a former American football wide receiver. He played for the Indianapolis Colts in 1986.

References

1962 births
Living people
Sportspeople from Meridian, Mississippi
Players of American football from Mississippi
American football wide receivers
Ole Miss Rebels football players
Indianapolis Colts players